Lorenzo Bianchi (1 April 1899 – 13 February 1983) was born in Italy, at Corteno, near Brescia. Mons. Lorenzo Bianchi was ordained Priest of Pontifical Institute for Foreign Missions (PIME) on 23 September 1922 and arrived in Hong Kong on 13 September 1923.

In 1924, Bianchi worked in Sai Kung, New Territories; from 1925 to 1929 in Swa Bue, Hoi Fung District; from 1930 to 1941 (and for a 2nd time from 1948 to 1949) he was the director of Hoi Fung District. He was appointed as coadjutor bishop of Hong Kong on 21 April 1949 and was consecrated titular bishop of Choma on 9 October 1949 and returned to Hoi Fung. He succeeded his predecessor on 3 September 1951 and, after he was released from China, installed on 26 October 1952. He resigned on 30 November 1968 and was appointed the titular bishop of Sorres until 10 October 1976. He returned to Italy 19 April 1969 and there died on 13 February 1983.

The Caritas Bianchi College of Careers (CBCC) in Hong Kong is named after Bianchi.

See also
Catholic Diocese of Hong Kong

References

External links
Official Biography on the Catholic Diocese of Hong Kong

Roman Catholic bishops of Hong Kong
Participants in the Second Vatican Council
20th-century Roman Catholic bishops in Hong Kong
1899 births
1983 deaths
20th-century Italian Roman Catholic priests